Spartak Ajazi (born 3 July 1994) is an Albanian professional footballer who plays as a forward for Albanian club FK Kukësi.

References

1994 births
Living people
People from Laç
Albanian footballers
Association football forwards
Shkëndija Tiranë players
KF Laçi players
KS Burreli players
KS Iliria players
Besëlidhja Lezhë players
KS Kastrioti players
Kategoria e Parë players
Kategoria Superiore players